Gabriel Sabourin is a Canadian actor and screenwriter from Quebec. He is most noted for the 2017 film It's the Heart That Dies Last (C'est le cœur qui meurt en dernier), for which he received Canadian Screen Award nominations for Best Actor and Best Adapted Screenplay at the 6th Canadian Screen Awards.

He is the son of actor Marcel Sabourin, and a graduate of the National Theatre School of Canada.

References

External links

20th-century Canadian male actors
21st-century Canadian male actors
Canadian male film actors
Canadian male television actors
Canadian screenwriters in French
Male actors from Quebec
Writers from Quebec
French Quebecers
Living people
National Theatre School of Canada alumni
Year of birth missing (living people)